Absolute Ego is the fourth studio album by Japanese singer-songwriter Aco. It was released via Ki/oon Records on December 15, 1999. It peaked at number 8 on the Oricon Albums Chart.

Track listing

Charts

References

External links 
 

1999 albums
Aco (musician) albums
Ki/oon Records albums